Circle symbol may refer to (in ascending order of size, approximately):
, ring diacritic
, white bullet
, function composition
, degree symbol
, masculine ordinal indicator
, music symbol denoting either a diminished triad or diminished seventh chord
, superscript lowercase letter o
, white circle Unicode symbol
, dotted circle
, lowercase vowel letters in the Latin, Greek (omicron), and Cyrillic alphabets
, Semitic/Phoenician letter Ayin, the ancestor of the Greek, Latin, Cyrillic etc. letters
, uppercase vowel letters in the Latin, Greek, and Cyrillic alphabets
, heavy circle Unicode symbol
, O mark, large circle Unicode symbol
, medium white circle Unicode symbol

See also
Circle (disambiguation)
Degree symbol#Lookalikes
O (disambiguation)
O#Related characters
0 (the number zero) 
Miscellaneous Mathematical Symbols-B (Unicode block)